The 312th Fighter Wing was a United States Army Air Forces organization.  It was a command and control organization of Fourteenth Air Force that fought in the China Burma India Theater of World War II.

History

Lineage 
Constituted as 312th Fighter Wing on March 7, 1944.
 Activated in China on March 13.
 Inactivated on November 5, 1945.

Assignments 
 Fourteenth Air Force, 13 March 1944 – 1 October 1945.
 Army Service Forces, 3–5 November 1945.

Stations 
 Kunming Airport, China, March 13, 1944.
 Chengtu Airfield, China, c. March 25, 1944 – c. October 1, 1945.
 Camp Kilmer, New Jersey, United States, c. November 3–5, 1945.

Major components 
 33d Fighter Group, 11 May –  24 August 1944 (P-38, P-47).
 81st Fighter Group, 12 May – 1 October 1945 (P-40, P-47).
 311th Fighter Group, 18 August 1944 – 1 October 1945 (P-51).

Operations history 
Activated in China on March 13, 1944. Assigned to Fourteenth Air Force. Commanded and controlled assigned units in combat in China from July 1944 until August 1945. Moved to the US, October–November 1945 and was inactivated.

References 

 Maurer, Maurer (1983). Air Force Combat Units Of World War II. Maxwell AFB, Alabama: Office of Air Force History. .

External links 

Fighter wings of the United States Army Air Forces
Military units and formations established in 1945